The 2015 Military World Games, officially known as the 6th CISM Military World Games and also known as Mungyeong 2015, is hosted from October 2–11, 2015 in Mungyeong, South Korea.

The games is the largest military sports event ever held in South Korea, with approximately 8,700 athletes from 110 countries competing in 24 sports. The Games were organized by the Ministry of National Defense Republic of Korea in accordance with CISM regulations and the rules of the International Sports Federations.

Venues

North Gyeongsang

Mungyeong

Pohang

Gimcheon

Andong

Yeongcheon

Yeongju

Sangju

Yecheon

Daegu

Participating nations

Algeria (56)
Albania (5)
Angola (2)
Armenia (15)
Argentina (2)
Azerbaijan (20)
Austria (37)
Brazil (329)
Bahrain (69)
Barbados (2)
Belarus (95)
Benin
Bosnia and Herzegovina (11)
Belgium (51)
Bulgaria (21)
Burkina Faso (3)
Canada (104)
Cameroon (55)
Central African Republic
Republic of the Congo (19)
Chile (32)
Colombia (31)
China (553)
Croatia (11)
Cyprus (8)
Czech Republic (27)
Chad (11)
Denmark (61)
Dominican Republic (31)
Ecuador (74)
Egypt (83)
Estonia (27)
Swaziland (2)
Finland (53)
France (273)
Germany (243)
Gabon (9)
Greece (46)
Guinea (14)
Hungary (56)
India (54)
Iran (90)
Iraq
Indonesia (46)
Italy (139)
 Ivory Coast
Jamaica
Jordan (5)
Kazakhstan (62)
Kenya (14)
Kuwait (35)
Lesotho (3)
Latvia (32)
Lebanon (7)
Lithuania (56)
Luxembourg (18)
Macedonia
Malawi
Mali
Mauritania
Morocco (24)
Monaco (2)
Mongolia (75)
Montenegro (2)
Macedonia (4)
Namibia (3)
Netherlands (89)
Niger (3)
Nigeria (12)
Norway (28)
Oman (63)
Pakistan (19)
Palestine (9)
Peru (15)
Poland (193)
Qatar (99)
Romania (77)
Russia (243)
Saudi Arabia (41)
Senegal (3)
Serbia (41)
Slovakia (14)
Slovenia (32)
South Korea (172)
Spain (111)
Sri Lanka (73)
Suriname
Sweden (72)
Switzerland (67)
Syria (15)
Tanzania (22)
Thailand (55)
Trinidad and Tobago
Tunisia (17)
Turkey (20)
United Arab Emirates (27)
United States (172)
Uganda (5)
Uzbekistan (50)
Ukraine (87)
Uruguay (27)
Venezuela (84)
Vietnam (32)
Zambia (13)
Zimbabwe (28)

Sports
The competition comprised 24 sports, some of them appearing for the first time in military world games, such as archery.

 Aeronautical pentathlon (details)

 (and Para Athletics)

Games schedule

Medal table

Source:

References

External links

Official website

 
Military World Games
Military World Games
Military
October 2015 sports events in South Korea
International sports competitions hosted by South Korea